Ross "Rosco" Halcrow (born 17 November 1966) is a New Zealand sailor who has won both the America's Cup and the Volvo Ocean Race.

Halcrow was a sailmaker and backup crew member for New Zealand Challenge in both the 1987 America's Cup and 1992 America's Cup. He sailed in the 1989–90 Whitbread Round the World Race on Fisher & Paykel NZ. He sailed on Pinta when it won the One Ton Cup in 1993.

He joined Team New Zealand and was part of the sailing crew on NZL 32 when it won the 1995 Louis Vuitton Cup and 1995 America's Cup.

He then competed in the 1997–98 Whitbread Round the World Race on Innovation Kvaerner before joining the New York Yacht Club's Young America challenge for the 2000 Louis Vuitton Cup where he sailed and was in charge of the sail program.

For the 2001–02 Volvo Ocean Race, Halcrow sailed on winner Illbruck Challenge. He joined the Ericsson Racing Team boat from leg 5 of the 2005–06 Volvo Ocean Race.

He joined Oracle Racing in 2003 and sailed with them in the 2007 Louis Vuitton Cup.

With Oracle, Halcrow came second in the 2010 RC44 World Championships before winning the 2010 America's Cup as the jib trimmer on USA 17.

In 2017 he won both the TP52 Super Series World Championship onboard Platoon, and the Maxi72 Superyacht World Championship onboard MOMO. Other World Championship include the 2014 Soto 40 Worlds and the 2022 6 metre Worlds.

He is married to American Lindsay Halcrow (born 19 June 1983).

References

External links
 

1966 births
Living people
New Zealand male sailors (sport)
Volvo Ocean Race sailors
1987 America's Cup sailors
1992 America's Cup sailors
1995 America's Cup sailors
2000 America's Cup sailors
2007 America's Cup sailors
2010 America's Cup sailors
Team New Zealand sailors
Oracle Racing sailors
World champions in sailing for New Zealand
6 Metre class world champions
TP52 class world champions
Soto 40 class world champions
6 Metre class sailors
TP 52 class sailors
Soto 40 class sailors